John Cameron (16 February 1827 – 6 April 1910) was a Canadian Roman Catholic priest and Bishop of Antigonish.

References

External links
 Catholic-Hierarchy entry

1827 births
1910 deaths
Roman Catholic bishops of Antigonish
19th-century Roman Catholic bishops in Canada
20th-century Roman Catholic bishops in Canada